HMS America was a 64-gun third-rate ship of the line of the Royal Navy, designed by John williams and built by Adam Hayes at Deptford Dockyard and was launched on 5 August 1777. The name was a traditional name in the Royal Navy and continued unabated despite the American War of Independence in 1776.

Service History

Her first commander was Lord Longford who took America into the Battle of Ushant as part of the Rear Squadron.

America took part in the Battle of the Chesapeake on 5 September 1781, and on 12 April 1782 saw action under command of Captain Thompson in the white squadron as part of the Battle of the Saintes against a French fleet.

In 1795 America was part of the British fleet at the Battle of Muizenberg.

America was under way off the Azores on 13 December 1800 when she ran against the Formigas Reef and suffered severe damage to her hull. With some difficulty she was refloated with the tide and returned to harbour. On 27 December Americas captain and senior officers were court martialled aboard , which was anchored off Port Royal, Jamaica. All were acquitted when the court established that the grounding had been caused by errors in the ship's charts, upon which the reef was marked as being substantially to the south of its actual location.

Following the grounding, America was withdrawn from active service and in 1801 was redesignated as a prison ship moored off Jamaica. In 1804 she was loaned to the Transport Board (implying she was still sea-worthy). She was decommissioned and broken up in 1807.

Notable Commanders

Lord Longford 1777 to 1779
James Macnamara 1790
John Blankett 1794 to 1796
Edward Buller 1796/7
Joseph Bingham 1800

Notes

References

 
 

 

Ships of the line of the Royal Navy
Intrepid-class ships of the line
1777 ships
Ships built in England
Maritime incidents in 1800
Shipwrecks of the Azores